Four Corners is an unincorporated community located in the town of Little Falls, Monroe County, Wisconsin, United States.

References

External links

Unincorporated communities in Monroe County, Wisconsin
Unincorporated communities in Wisconsin